This is a list of electoral results for the Melbourne North Province in Victorian state elections.

Members for Melbourne North Province

Election results

Elections in the 2000s

Elections in the 1990s

This election was caused by the vacancy following the resignation of Caroline Hogg.

Elections in the 1980s

Elections in the 1970s

 Preferences were not distributed.

 Two party preferred vote was estimated.

 Two party preferred vote was estimated.

Elections in the 1960s

 Two party preferred was estimated.

 Two party preferred vote was estimated.

Elections in the 1950s

 Two party preferred vote was estimated.
 Jack Little was elected in 1952 as a member of Labor, then defected to the DLP in 1955.

References

Victoria (Australia) state electoral results by district